Wakil Ahmed is a Bangladeshi film director and singer. In 2016, he won the Bangladesh National Film Award for Best Male Playback Singer for the film Darpan Bishorjon.

Directed films
 Sot Manush’ (Honest Man)
 Kato Swapno Kato Asha

Awards

References

External links
 

Living people
21st-century Bangladeshi male singers
21st-century Bangladeshi singers
Best Male Playback Singer National Film Award (Bangladesh) winners
Year of birth missing (living people)